Andrej Segeč (born 24 May 1994) is a Slovak cross-country skier. He competed in the 2018 Winter Olympics.

References

1994 births
Living people
Cross-country skiers at the 2018 Winter Olympics
Slovak male cross-country skiers
Olympic cross-country skiers of Slovakia
Sportspeople from Zvolen
Cross-country skiers at the 2012 Winter Youth Olympics
Competitors at the 2015 Winter Universiade